The 1979 Louisville Cardinals football team was an American football team that represented the University of Louisville as an independent during the 1979 NCAA Division I-A football season. In their fifth season under head coach Vince Gibson, the Cardinals compiled a 4–6–1 record and were outscored by a total of 202 to 167.

The team's statistical leaders included Stu Stram with 806 passing yards, Greg Hickman with 648 rushing yards and 24 points scored, and Randy Butler with 347 receiving yards.

Schedule

Roster

References

Louisville
Louisville Cardinals football seasons
Louisville Cardinals football